Me declaro culpable (English: I Plead Guilty) is a Mexican telenovela that premiered on Las Estrellas on 6 November 2017 and ended on 28 January 2018.

It stars Daniela Castro, Mayrín Villanueva, and Juan Soler as main characters, with Juan Diego Covarrubias, Irina Baeva, Pedro Moreno, Sabine Moussier, and Enrique Rocha.

Cast

Main 
 Daniela Castro as Roberta Monroy de Urzúa
 Mayrín Villanueva as Alba Castillo
 Juan Soler as Franco Urzúa
 Juan Diego Covarrubias as Paolo Leiva Ruiz
 Irina Baeva as Natalia Urzúa
 Pedro Moreno as Julián Soberón
 Sabine Moussier as Ingrid Dueñas
 Enrique Rocha as Mauro Monroy
 Alejandro Ávila as Gael Ahumada
 Ramiro Fumazoni as Tiziano Castolo
 Alejandra García as Katia Romo
 Lisset as Bianca Olmedo
 Margarita Magaña as Julieta
 Amairani as Luciana
 Arlette Pacheco as Queta
 Alejandro Aragón as Raúl
 Ricardo Vera as Dr. Mendizabal
 Mariano Palacios as Dante
 Ramsés Alemán as Emanuel
 Bibelot Mansur as Celia
 Amanda Libertad as Olga
 Mikel Mateos as Gabriel
 Christian Vega as Pedro
 Marco Méndez as Javier

Special guest stars 
 Miguel Herrera as Himself

Production 
The production of the series began on August 24, 2017. The series is produced for Televisa by Angelli Nesma Medina, based on the story written by Martín Kweller and Gabriel Corrado titled Por amarte así.

Casting 
Angelique Boyer was initially contemplated to be part of the telenovela, but later it was announced that her exclusivity agreement with Televisa had ended, so Boyer decided to reject the project. After Boyer leaves the project it was confirmed that Irina Baeva and Juan Diego Covarrubias would be the young protagonists of the story. On August 15, 2017, People en Español magazine reported that Mayrín Villanueva would star in the telenovela. On August 29, 2017 it was confirmed that Daniela Castro and Juan Soler would be the main characters of the story. Both actors had already starred in a 1996 telenovela titled Cañaveral de pasiones.

Episodes

Ratings 
 
}}

Awards and nominations

References

External links 
 

Televisa telenovelas
Mexican telenovelas
Mexican LGBT-related television shows
2017 Mexican television series debuts
2018 Mexican television series endings
2017 telenovelas
Spanish-language telenovelas